Picardia orchatias is a moth of the family Pterophoridae. It is known from Madagascar and South Africa.
This species has a wingspan of 23mm

References

Oidaematophorini
Moths of Madagascar
Moths of Africa
Moths described in 1908
Taxa named by Edward Meyrick